Stephen James Blyth is a British mathematician and academic. Since October 2022, he has been Principal of Lady Margaret Hall, Oxford. He had been Professor of the Practice of Statistics at Harvard University since 2012, and was also chief executive officer of the Harvard Management Company between January 2015 and July 2016.

Biography
Blyth matriculated into Christ's College, Cambridge in 1985 to study the Mathematical Tripos. He graduated with a first class honours Bachelor of Arts (BA) degree, and was the 3rd wrangler in that year. He then moved to the United States, where he studied statistics at Harvard University. He was awarded a Master of Arts (AM) degree in 1989. His doctoral dissertation was titled "Local Regression Coefficients and the Correlation Curve" and his advisor was Kjell Doksum. His Doctor of Philosophy (PhD) degree was awarded in 1992.

After graduating with his PhD, he returned to England and was a lecturer in the Department of Mathematics at Imperial College London from 1992 to 1994. He then moved into the financial industry, working at HSBC , Morgan Stanley and Deutsche Bank. In 2006, he returned to Harvard University where he joined the faculty. He taught statistics in the Harvard Faculty of Arts and Sciences, rising to become Professor of the Practice of Statistics in 2012. He also worked with the Harvard Management Company (HMC) which manages Harvard University's endowment and related financial assets. By 2014, he was managing director and head of public markets. In September 2014, he was announced as the next president and chief executive officer of the Harvard Management Company: he took up the post on 1 January 2015. He took medical leave from 23 May 2016, and stepped down as CEO on 27 July 2016.

In December 2021, Blyth was announced as the next Principal of Lady Margaret Hall, Oxford. He took up the post on 1 October 2022 and was installed during a service in the College Chapel on 7 October 2022.

Selected works

References

Living people
Year of birth missing (living people)
British mathematicians
British statisticians
Harvard University faculty
Principals of Lady Margaret Hall, Oxford
Alumni of Christ's College, Cambridge
Harvard University alumni
Academics of Imperial College London